Aquimarina seongsanensis  is a Gram-negative and strictly aerobic bacterium from the genus of Aquimarina which has been isolated from seawater from Jeju Island in Korea.

References 

Flavobacteria
Bacteria described in 2017